The 1863 United States Senate election in Massachusetts was held on January 9, 1863. Incumbent Charles Sumner was re-elected to a third term in office.

At the time, Massachusetts elected United States senators by a majority vote of each separate house of the Massachusetts General Court: the House and the Senate.

Background
In the 1862 state legislative elections, supporters of the Lincoln administration who nonetheless opposed the emancipation of Southern slaves and Senator Sumner's re-election organized a "People's Convention," hoping to consolidate opposition and gain enough seats in the legislature to deny Sumner election. However, the legislature remained largely Republican, ensuring Sumner's victory in the January election.

House

Senate

The lone vote for Adams was cast by Senator Whitney of Hampden. Senator Crane of Worcester County did not vote.

References

1863
Massachusetts
United States Senate